Lecithocera tienchiensis is a moth in the family Lecithoceridae first described by Kyu-Tek Park in 1999. It is found in Taiwan.

The wingspan is 16–18 mm. The forewings are greyish brown, broader toward the termen and with brown scales sparsely scattered beyond two thirds length. The color changes to light orange along the costa on the under surface. There are two discal spots, the inner one is slightly smaller than the outer one. The hindwings are grey.

Etymology
The species name is derived from the type locality.

References

Moths described in 1999
tienchiensis